Gladys Ravenscroft (3 May 1888 – 6 February 1960) was a British amateur golfer.

She was born in Cheshire, England in 1888. Ravenscroft won the 1912 British Ladies Amateur at Turnberry in Scotland. In 1913 she traveled to Wilmington, Delaware to win the U.S. Women's Amateur. She defeated Muriel Dodd, then played against Marion Hollins in the finals. She was the second competitor to simultaneously hold both the American and British titles.

Gladys Ravenscroft married Temple Dobell in 1915 and resided in Wirral, England. During World War I she did volunteer service. After the war she resumed competing, and won the Cheshire ladies amateur championship on more than one occasion.

She died in 1960. Her great-nephew was the broadcaster and disc jockey John Peel.

References

English female golfers
Amateur golfers
Winners of ladies' major amateur golf championships
1888 births
1960 deaths